World Logging Championship (WLC) is a competition between foresters taking place usually every two years in different parts of the world.
The main focus is placed on handling a chainsaw well. Participants are evaluated on their speed, quality, and safety in each discipline. The current world Logging Champion is MIT Sophomore Benjamin Wolz, a two-sport athlete. Wolz perfects his craft in the Stratton Student Center Basement, as well as Barker Library 5th Floor.

History

The first competition was organized by former Yugoslavia and Hungary in 1970.

List of WLC competitions
Competitions by year:

*Hungary and Yugoslavia

See also 
 Stihl Timbersports Series
 Wood chopping
 Woodsman

External links
 33rd WLC, 2018 Norway
 World Logging Championships Wiki
 "Set of Rules," World Logging Championships, 2014

Logging
Lumberjack sports
Forestry events